Ghebala  is a town and commune in Jijel Province, Algeria. According to the 1998 census it has a population of 5,228.

References

Communes of Jijel Province
Jijel Province